Santana is an American rock band formed in San Francisco in 1966 by Mexican-born guitarist Carlos Santana. The band has undergone multiple recording and performing line-ups in its history, with Santana the only consistent member. After signing with Columbia Records, the band's appearance at the Woodstock Festival in 1969 increased their profile and went on to record the commercially successful and critically-acclaimed albums Santana (1969), Abraxas (1970), and Santana III (1971). These were recorded by the group's "classic" line-up, featuring Gregg Rolie, Michael Carabello, Michael Shrieve, David Brown, and José "Chepito" Areas. Hit songs of this period include "Evil Ways", "Black Magic Woman", "Oye Como Va", and the instrumental "Samba Pa Ti".

Following a change in line-up and musical direction in 1972, the band experimented with elements of jazz fusion on Caravanserai (1972), Welcome (1973), and Borboletta (1974). Santana reached a new peak of commercial and critical success with Supernatural (1999) and its singles "Smooth", featuring singer Rob Thomas, and "Maria Maria" featuring The Product G&B. The album reached No. 1 in eleven countries and sold 12 million copies in the US alone. In 2014, the "classic" line-up reunited for Santana IV (2016) and the group continue to perform and record.

Santana is one of the best-selling groups of all time with over 47 million certified albums sold in the US, and an estimated 100 million sold worldwide. Its discography includes 25 studio albums, 14 of which reached the US top 10. In 1998, the line-up of Santana, Rolie, Carabello, Shrieve, Brown, and Areas was inducted into the Rock and Roll Hall of Fame. In 2000, the band won eight Grammy Awards in one night, a record tied with Michael Jackson, and three Latin Grammy Awards.

History

1966–1972: Formation and breakthrough
In 1966, Santana left Mexico for San Francisco, where he discovered the hippie and counterculture movement and found himself "wanting to be part of this new wave." Later that year, he began to assemble his own band, the first line-up of which included Sergio "Gus" Rodriguez on bass, Danny Haro on drums, and Michael Carabello on percussion. In January 1967, the four were granted an audition spot for concert promoter Bill Graham at the Fillmore Auditorium on a bill with the Paul Butterfield Blues Band and the Charles Lloyd Quartet, and named themselves the Santana Blues Band. Within a month, the group expanded with the addition of Tom Fraser on guitar and vocals, who also brought in Gregg Rolie on organ and vocals. The band stalled for several weeks, however, after Carlos was hospitalised with tuberculosis. In June 1967, Graham fired the group from performing at the Fillmore after some members turned up late for a gig supporting The Who and Loading Zone. The incident drove Carlos to bring in new and committed musicians, keeping Rolie with him. By the year's end, the band adopted the shorter name of Santana. Until early 1969, the band were joined by Marcus Malone on percussion, who left the group after being convicted of manslaughter.

In late 1968, the group secured a record deal with Columbia Records, following a successful audition opening for The Grateful Dead. The band had caught the interest of Columbia and Atlantic Records, and an audition was organised for both labels, but Carlos refused to perform for Atlantic as he wanted to be on the same label as Miles Davis and Bob Dylan. In December, Santana performed a series of concerts at the Fillmore that were recorded for a proposed live album. Biographer Simon Leng said it marked Santana moving away from its blues and R&B roots towards the "Santana sound" with the addition of Afro-Cuban and jazz numbers into their sets. After several line-up changes, the group finally stabilised in May 1969 with Santana, Rolie, Carabello, David Brown on bass, Michael Shrieve on drums, and Jose "Chepito" Areas on percussion, which became known as the "classic" line-up.

The band recorded their debut album, Santana, in San Francisco in May 1969. It was their third go at recording an album, after previous attempts failed to produce results they wanted. The sessions featured Alberto Gianquinto on piano, who also helped with the arrangements of the tracks. He quickly noticed the group's main problem: the solo spots were too long. Graham agreed, and advised that the band needed to cut the lengthy jams and begin constructing songs. He also got the band to listen to Willie Bobo's version of "Evil Ways", and suggested they record their own version. With the album recorded, Graham arranged for Santana to tour the Midwest as openers for Crosby, Stills and Nash, which expanded the group's profile outside the West Coast. Around this time, Graham had been asked to help organise the upcoming Woodstock Festival, agreed to promote it on the condition that Santana would be added to the bill. Graham persisted, and the band were assigned a 45-minute set in the afternoon of August 16, the second day, for $2,500. The performance launched the group to international fame, and Santana, released on August 30, peaked at No. 4 on the US Billboard 200. The first single, "Jingo", was followed by "Evil Ways", which peaked at No. 9 on the Billboard Hot 100. In October 1969, Graham had Santana perform on The Ed Sullivan Show, further increasing the group's nationwide exposure.

In April 1970, Santana returned to the studio to record its second album, Abraxas. The album, highlighted by a reworking of "Black Magic Woman" by Fleetwood Mac that peaked at No. 4 in the US Billboard Hot 100, was released in September 1970 and rose to number 1 on the US Billboard 200.

By 1971, the group were still struggling to maintain a strong musical direction. From January to July they recorded Santana III. Released in September 1971, the album also reached number 1 on the US Billboard 200. At the peak of the band's popularity, the album was the last to feature its classic Woodstock era line-up. Santana explained that there was a lot of unnecessary internal resentment and that managerial problems contributed to the problem, leading to Graham's dismissal. That year, they performed at a concert in Accra to commemorate Ghana's 14th Independence Day. The concert was filmed and released in theaters as Soul to Soul. Matters came to a head shortly before the Santana III tour in September 1971 began, when Carlos wanted Carabello to leave the group, otherwise he would. The band started the tour without Carlos, performing amidst shouts from the audience for the guitarist. After several gigs, Carlos reunited with the band to find Carabello, Areas, and manager/promoter Stan Marcum had quit, leaving the band to perform without percussionists. James "Mingo" Lewis was quickly brought in as a temporary replacement after he saw the band live and offered his services. Santana's gig in Lima, Peru in December 1971 brought further trouble, as the outbreak of violence resulted in their equipment being confiscated and the band deported from the country. The incident was a wake up call for Carlos, who was determined to "bring the madness to an end."

In 1972, Santana had been increasingly influenced by the music of Miles Davis, John Coltrane, and Joe Zawinul, who had explored jazz fusion by this time. The fourth album, Caravanserai (1972), marked a number of line-up changes; bassist David Brown left in 1971 before recording started and was replaced by Doug Rauch and Tom Rutley. Carabello was replaced with two percussionists, Armando Peraza and Mingo Lewis. Rolie was replaced by Tom Coster on a few songs. Caravanserai debuted at number 8 in the US.

1973–1979: Experimentation and consolidation

13 months after Caravanserai, Santana released Welcome. Welcome was the first of four consecutive albums to achieve gold certification, as opposed to the previous four, which all at least reached platinum status. The album peaked at number 25 on the Billboard 200, the lowest of the band's career so far. The next few albums contained a more experimental style than their previous work, beginning with Borboletta, which fared arguably worse than its predecessor, despite climbing five spots higher on the Billboard album charts in the US.

The group's 1976 release, Amigos, was far more successful. Reaching number 10 on the US charts, and also hitting the top 10 in France, Australia, New Zealand, Austria and the Netherlands, it was a return to the success of their early albums. Festival, did not obtain the same new-found success, but was followed by another successful album, Moonflower, released in 1977. The album was possibly the most successful since Santana III, achieving 2× platinum in the US, and being the first album since 1974's Borboletta, to break the top 10 in the UK. It was characterized by a stylistic shift for the band, as it contained heavier influences from the more conventional sound of the group's early work, while still maintaining the experimental sound of their last few albums.

Their next two releases, Inner Secrets and Marathon, released in 1978 and '79, respectively, were a further musical shift for the band, moving away from the Latin-fused rock music that had characterized their work in the late 1960s and the majority of the '70s, to move towards a more album-oriented, conventional rock sound. These albums, however, fared poorly commercially, although both achieved gold status in the US.

1980–1997: Commercial decline and seven-year hiatus
The 1980s started relatively brightly for Santana, with 1981's platinum-selling Zebop!, which also reached the top 20 in several countries, and continued the more conventional rock sound. The following year, Shangó was released; this album marked a steep decline in the band's commercial fortunes, although it still achieved gold status.

The group waited another three years to release the follow-up, the longest break for them so far. 1985's Beyond Appearances was a commercial failure, and their first album not to achieve gold certification. Their following three releases all continued this commercial decline, with the last of these failing to break the Billboard top 100. In the midst of this commercial pitfall, the band stopped recording material for an unprecedented seven years but continued to tour.

1998–2001: Supernatural and the Rock and Roll Hall of Fame
In 1998, Santana was inducted into the Rock and Roll Hall of Fame. The following year, their album Supernatural (1999) debuted at number 19 on the Billboard 200 and reached No. 1 after eighteen weeks. Also reaching No. 1 were two singles: "Smooth", recorded with Rob Thomas, and "Maria Maria" featuring The Product G&B. The album was certified platinum 15 times by the RIAA and sold 30 million copies worldwide. Santana's previous number one album had been Santana III in 1971. According to Guinness World Records, this is the longest gap between number one albums.

Supernatural won nine Grammy Awards, including the award for Album of the Year, and also won three Latin Grammy Awards, including Record of the Year.

2002–2012: Dealing with new-found success

The follow-up to Supernatural came three years later and was highly anticipated by international media and fans alike. On October 22, 2002, Shaman was released worldwide. Although it initially sold briskly (298,973 copies in the US in its first week) and debuted at number 1 on the Billboard 200, the album's appeal quickly wore off and it soon slid down the charts. Despite this, it went on to sell 2× platinum in the US, and achieved platinum status in several other countries including Australia. The first single released from the album, "The Game of Love", which featured vocals from Michelle Branch, debuted at number 5 on the Hot 100. The album's next four singles failed to chart in most countries, but the final single, "Why Don't You & I", featuring the vocals of Alex Band, reached number 8 on the Hot 100. Musically, the album was a return to a more conventional sound for the group, with a mainly Latin rock-based sound.

With their renewed appeal worn off, another three-year wait saw the release of 2005's All That I Am. The album debuted at number 2 on the Billboard 200 but fared worse internationally, and quickly lost appeal. The album, a continuation of the Latin-rock influenced sound of Shaman, achieved gold certification in the US. A five-year break from recording saw the release of another studio album, Guitar Heaven (2010). Musically it was a drastic change for the band, with a far heavier sound at its core and strong heavy metal influences. It debuted at number 5 on the Billboard 200 but marked another decline for the band, failing to achieve gold status.

In 2012 the group released Shape Shifter, which returned to the conventional Latin rock sound and was completely album-oriented, as no singles were released from it. It debuted at number 16 on the Billboard 200.

2013–present: Reunion of the classic line-up, Corazón, Santana IV, and Africa Speaks
On 2 February 2013, Carlos Santana confirmed that he would reunite his classic line-up, most of whom played Woodstock with him in 1969. Santana stated that he was reuniting the group with the intention of recording new music. Confirmed for the reunion were Neal Schon, who was in the band in the early 1970s where he traded lead guitar work with Santana before leaving with founding Santana singer-organist Gregg Rolie in 1973 to form Journey; drummer Mike Shrieve and percussionist Mike Carabello. Santana said of Rolie, who played with Ringo Starr's All-Starr Band for the last two years, "I'm pretty sure Gregg's going to do it." In February 2013, Rolie told Radio.com, "it's (the reunion) just a matter of putting it together and going and doing it. I would do it. I think it's a great idea. People would love it. It could be great!"

In the meantime, on 6 May 2014 Santana released a new studio album entitled Corazón and on 9 September 2014, Corazón – Live from Mexico: Live It to Believe It, a new live album (on CD, DVD and Blu-ray) of their show on 14 December 2013 in Guadalajara, Mexico.

On 15 April 2016, Santana released Santana IV, the wildly anticipated studio album that reunited the early 1970s classic lineup of Carlos Santana (guitar, vocals), Gregg Rolie (keyboards, lead vocals), Neal Schon (guitar, vocals), Michael Carabello (percussion) and Michael Shrieve (drums). The album marked the first time in 45 years – since 1971's multi-platinum classic Santana III – that the quintet had recorded together.

The origins for the reunion go back several years, when Schon suggested that he and Carlos Santana record together. Santana liked the idea but went one better, proposing that they recruit Rolie, Shrieve and Carabello for what would be called "Santana IV". After initial writing sessions and rehearsals took place in 2013, the group recorded throughout 2014 and 2015, amassing 16 new tracks that combined all their signature elements – Afro-Latin rhythms, soaring vocals, electrifying blues-psychedelic guitar solos, and irrepressible jubilant percussion work.

About the "Santana IV" team, Santana stated: "It was magical, we didn't have to try to force the vibe – it was immense. From there, we then needed to come up with a balance of songs and jams that people would immediately identify as Santana."

Santana IV features 16 all-new tracks written and produced by the band. Joining the core "Santana IV" band in the studio are current Santana members Karl Perazzo (percussion) and Benny Rietveld (bass), with vocalist Ronald Isley guesting on two cuts.

The first single from Santana IV, entitled "Anywhere You Want to Go", was released on 5 February 2016.

On 21 October 2016, Santana released Santana IV: Live at the House of Blues Las Vegas on Eagle Rock Entertainment, a new (151 minutes) live album (on DVD/Blu-ray/2CD) of their concert on 21 March 2016 at House of Blues in Mandalay Bay Resort and Casino on the Las Vegas Strip in Nevada.

In early January 2019, Santana signed with Concord Records and on 25 January, they released In Search of Mona Lisa, a new (5-track) EP. The day before, they also released a video for new single, "Do You Remember Me." In March 2019, the band announced plans to release on June 7, 2019, Africa Speaks, their new full-length album produced by Rick Rubin.

2019 marked the 20th anniversary of Carlos Santana's album, Supernatural, and the 50th anniversary of his performance at Woodstock. Santana headlined a multi-year residency at House of Blues. The band was expected to headline at both Woodstock 50 (which was cancelled) and Bethel Woods' half-centennial celebration in Bethel, NY, in August 2019. The band toured in support of the latest album, from April to November 2019.

2021: Blessings and Miracles
On 18 and 20 August 2021, "Move" and "She's Fire", the first and second singles taken from Santana's (then) forthcoming new album Blessings and Miracles, were released, and it was announced that the album would be released on 15 October 2021 via BMG Entertainment.

Personnel
Bold denotes members of the classic lineup.

Current members

 Carlos Santana – lead guitar, vocals, percussion (1966–present)
 Benny Rietveld – bass (1990–1992, 1997–present)
 Karl Perazzo – percussion (1991–present)
 Andy Vargas – vocals (2000–present)
 Tommy Anthony – rhythm guitar, vocals (2005–present)
 David K. Mathews – keyboards (2011–present)
 Paoli Mejías – percussion (2013–present)
 Cindy Blackman Santana – drums (2015–present)
 Ray Greene – vocals (2016–present)

Former members

 Gregg Rolie − organ, lead vocals (1966-1972, 2014–2016)
 Tom Fraser – guitars (1966–1967)
 Sergio "Gus" Rodriguez – bass (1966–1967)
 Rod Harper – drums (1966–1967)
 Michael Carabello − percussion (1966-1967, 1968–1971, 2014–2016)
 Marcus Malone − percussion (1967-1969; died 2021)
 David Brown – bass (1967–1971, 1974–1976; died 2000)
 Bob Livingston – drums (1967–69)
 José "Chepito" Areas – percussion (1969–1974, 1976–1977, 1988–1989)
 Mike Shrieve − drums, percussion (1969-1974, 2014–2016)
 Neal Schon – lead and rhythm guitar (1971–1972, 2014–2016)
 Tom Rutley – bass (1971–1972)
 Buddy Miles – drums, percussion (1971, 1972), vocals, guitar (1986, 1987; died 2008)
 Pete Escovedo – percussion (1971, 1977–1979)
 Coke Escovedo – percussion (1971–1972; died 1986)
 Rico Reyes – percussion (1971–1972)
 Victor Pantoja – percussion (1971)
 Tom Coster – keyboards (1972–1978, 1983–1984)
 Armando Peraza – percussion (1972–1976, 1977–1990; died 2014)
 Richard Kermode – keyboards (1972–1973; died 1996)
 Doug Rauch – bass (1972–1974; died 1979)
 James "Mingo" Lewis – percussion (1972–1973)
 Leon Thomas – vocals (1973; died 1999)
 Leon "Ndugu" Chancler – drums (1974–1976, 1988; died 2018)
 Leon Patillo – vocals (1974–1975, 1976)
 Jules Broussard – saxophone (1974–1975)
 Greg Walker – vocals (1975–1976, 1976–1979, 1983–1985)
 Raul Rekow – percussion (1976–2013; died 2015)
 Gaylord Birch – drums (1976, 1991; died 1996)
 Graham Lear – drums (1976–1983, 1985–1987)
 Luther Rabb – vocals (1976; died 2006)
 Joel Badie – vocals (1976)
 Byron Miller – bass (1976)
 Pablo Tellez – bass (1976–1977)
 David Margen – bass (1977–1982)
 Chris Solberg – guitars (1978–1980)
 Chris Rhyne – keyboards (1978–1979)
 Russell Tubbs – flute (1978)
 Alex Ligertwood – vocals (1979–1983, 1984–1985, 1987, 1989–1991, 1992–1994)
 Alan Pasqua – keyboards (1979–1980)
 Orestes Vilató – percussion (1980–1987)
 Richard Baker – keyboards (1980–1982)
 Chester D. Thompson – keyboards (1983–2009)
 Keith Jones – bass (1983–1984, 1989)
 David Sancious – keyboards (1984)
 Chester C. Thompson – drums (1984)
 Alphonso Johnson – bass (1985–1989, 1992)
 Sterling Crew – keyboards (1986)
 Walfredo Reyes – drums (1989–1991, 1992–1993)
 Billy Johnson – drums (1991, 1994, 2000–2001)
 Tony Lindsay – vocals (1991, 1995–2004, 2007–2015)
 Myron Dove – rhythm guitar, piccolo bass (1992–1996, 2003–2005)
 Vorriece Cooper – vocals (1992–1993)
 Oran Coltrane – saxophone (1992)
 Rodney Holmes – drums (1993–1994, 1997–2000)
 Tommie Bradford – drums (1994)
 Curtis Salgado – vocals, harmonica (1995)
 Horacio "El Negro" Hernandez – drums (1997)
 Ricky Wellman – drums (1997)
 Dennis Chambers – drums (2002–2013)
 Freddie Ravel – keyboards (2009–2010)
 José "Pepe" Jimenez – drums (2013–2015)
 Christopher A. Scott – bass, vocals (2002–2005)
 Bill Ortiz – trumpet (1999–2016)
 Jeff Cressman – trombone (1999–2016)

Timeline

Discography

 Santana (1969)
 Abraxas (1970)
 Santana III (1971)
 Caravanserai (1972)
 Welcome (1973)
 Borboletta (1974)
 Amigos (1976)
 Festivál (1977)
 Moonflower (1977)
 Inner Secrets (1978)
 Marathon (1979)
 Zebop! (1981)
 Shangó (1982)
 Beyond Appearances (1985)
 Freedom (1987)
 Spirits Dancing in the Flesh (1990)
 Milagro (1992)
 Supernatural (1999)
 Shaman (2002)
 All That I Am (2005)
 Guitar Heaven  (2010)
 Shape Shifter (2012)
 Corazón (2014)
 Santana IV (2016)
 Africa Speaks (2019)
 Blessings and Miracles (2021)

Awards and nominations

Santana has won numerous awards, including eight Grammy Awards and three Latin Grammy Awards. The band was inducted into the Rock and Roll Hall of Fame in 1998; two of Santana's albums have been inducted the Grammy Hall of Fame (Abraxas in 1999 and the original Santana in 2012); and one song has been inducted into the Latin Grammy Hall of Fame ("Oye Como Va" in 2001).

References

Sources

External links
 

 
Acid rock music groups
1966 establishments in California
APRA Award winners
Columbia Records artists
Grammy Award winners
Latin Grammy Award winners
Latin music groups
Musical groups established in 1966
Musical groups from San Francisco
Psychedelic rock music groups from California
World Music Awards winners
American blues rock musical groups
Jam bands